De Dodes Fjord (meaning "The Fjord of the Dead") is a fjord in northwestern Greenland. Administratively it belongs to the Avannaata municipality.

Geography
De Dodes Fjord opens to the south, east of the Crimson Cliffs in the Cape York area, close to the cape itself. Salve Island is located to the east of its mouth. Sidebriksfjord is located next to it to the east, separated from it by a promontory. The fjord is bordered on both sides by glaciated plateaux.

See also
List of fjords of Greenland

References

External links
Collecting Samples at De Dodes Fjord

Fjords of Greenland